Eliezer ben Yoel HaLevi of Bonn (Hebrew acronym  Ra'avyah; 1140–1225) was a Rabbinic scholar in Germany. He had a significant influence on Asher ben Jehiel (the ROSH). As a Rishon, he was prominent amongst the Tosafists of the middle-ages, and was a signatory to the Takkanot Shum.  In the course of his long life he wandered from place to place: Bonn, Worms, Würzburg, Mainz, Cologne, Regensburg, and throughout France and Lombardy.

His maternal grandfather was Eliezer ben Nathan (Ra'avan). Eliezer studied under his father Joel haLevi of Bonn, as well as under Judah HeHasid and Judah ben Kalonymus of Mainz. His brother died a martyr's death in 1216. Eliezer's mourning for him was so great that his vision was impaired and he was compelled to dictate his novellae to his students.

His major work, Sefer Avi HaEzri (My Father is my Help), which is more commonly known by its author's acronym as Sefer Ra'avyah (also spelled Sefer Rabiah), is a compendium of articles that he developed into a book. It contains halakhot and legal decisions.

Notes

References

Further reading

German Tosafists
Levites
1140 births
1225 deaths
12th-century German rabbis
13th-century German rabbis

German male writers
Authors of books on Jewish law